Timothy O'Callaghan (born 1935) is an Irish retired Gaelic footballer who played as a right corner-back for the Cork senior team.

O'Callaghan joined the team during the 1957 championship and was a regular member of the starting fifteen until his retirement following the completion of the 1964 championship. During that time he enjoyed little success on the inter-county seen, winning just one Munster medal as a non-playing substitute.

O'Callaghan also enjoyed a successful club career with Macroom, winning two county club championship medals.

References

1935 births
Living people
Macroom Gaelic footballers
Cork inter-county Gaelic footballers